The Austin Press was a weekly newspaper published in Austin, Texas for less than a year from September 1981 to May 1982.

The newspaper provided notable coverage of a 1981 Travis County Jail riot and lawsuit, Barton Creek environmental coverage regarding chemicals found in the water, protests about the local landfill, the extension of Mopac Expressway, and local economic local development in the downtown and Rainey areas.

After the late 1981 demise of the city's second daily newspaper, the Austin Citizen, the Press considered moving to daily publication to fill its void and compete with the  establishment daily Austin American-Statesman.

Austin Press writers included Winston Bode, Carin Pratt, Kim McCormick, Karen-Ann Broe, David Chapin, John Havens, Joanna London, Stephen Morgan, Kevin Phinney, and Leslie Whitaker. Gary Entress was the newspaper's publisher.

Early in the newspaper's run, Entress touted his newspaper as having "a reputation for good, aggressive reporting and writing, free from influence from special interests". It was editorially left-leaning.

Notes

References

Weekly newspapers published in Texas
Defunct weekly newspapers
Defunct newspapers published in Texas
1981 establishments in Texas
1982 disestablishments in Texas
Newspapers established in 1981
Publications disestablished in 1982
History of Austin, Texas
Newspapers published in Austin, Texas